Treat Conrad Huey and Harsh Mankad defeated Serbian pair Ilija Bozoljac and Dušan Vemić 6–4, 6–4 in the final.

Seeds

Draw

Draw

References
 Doubles Draw
 Qualifying Doubles Draw

Royal Bank of Scotland Challenger - Doubles
2009 Doubles